Ancyrochitina is an extinct genus of chitinozoans. It was described by Alfred Eisenack in 1955.

Species
 Ancyrochitina ancyrea (Eisenack, 1931)
 Ancyrochitina ansarviensis Laufeld, 1974
 Ancyrochitina bifurcaspina Nestor, 1994
 Ancyrochitina bornholmensis Vandenbroucke & Nõlvak, 2013
 Ancyrochitina brevispinosa Eisenack, 1968
 Ancyrochitina clathrospinosa Eisenack, 1968
 Ancyrochitina convexa Nestor, 1980
 Ancyrochitina diabolus (Eisenack, 1937)
 Ancyrochitina digitata Mullins et Aldridge, 2004
 Ancyrochitina fragilis Eisenack, 1955
 Ancyrochitina gogginensis Sutherland, 1994
 Ancyrochitina gutnica Laufeld, 1974
 Ancyrochitina laevaensis Nestor, 1980
 Ancyrochitina mullinsi Nestor, 2005
 Ancyrochitina paulaspina Nestor, 1994
 Ancyrochitina pedavis Laufeld, 1974
 Ancyrochitina plurispinosa Nestor, 1994
 Ancyrochitina porrectaspina Nestor, 1994
 Ancyrochitina primitiva Eisenack, 1964
 Ancyrochitina ramosaspina Nestor, 1994
 Ancyrochitina rumbaensis Nestor, 1994
 Ancyrochitina tomentosa Taugourdeau et de Jekhowsky, 1960
 Ancyrochitina vikiensis Nestor, 1994

References

Prehistoric marine animals
Fossil taxa described in 1955